Mystery of Crocodile Island is the fifty-fifth volume in the Nancy Drew Mystery Stories series. It was first published in 1978 under the pseudonym Carolyn Keene. The actual author was ghostwriter Harriet Stratemeyer Adams.

Plot 

Nancy responds to a friend's frantic call for help and she and her father travel to Crocodile Island in Florida with Bess and George to study the reptiles and try to uncover a group of poachers. Upon arriving, the group is kidnapped, but they escape and uncover a sinister plot involving many unsuspected victims.

References

Nancy Drew books
1978 American novels
1978 children's books
Grosset & Dunlap books
Novels set on islands
Novels set in Florida
Children's mystery novels